The Whitby Mudstone is a Toarcian (Early Jurassic; Falciferum-Bifrons in regional chronostratigraphy) geological formation in Yorkshire and Worcestershire, England. The formation, part of the Lias Group, is present in the Cleveland and Worcester Basins and the East Midlands Shelf.

Lithology 
The formation consists of mudstone and siltstone, partly laminated and bituminous, medium to dark grey in colour, with rare fine grained calcareous sandstone beds. Limestone and phosphatic nodules are present at some levels.

Fossil content 
Dinosaur remains are among the fossils that have been recovered from the formation, although none have yet been referred to a specific genus. One of the more notable discoveries is the skull of the pterosaur Parapsicephalus, found within the Alum Shale Member.

Vertebrates

Insects 
Insect compression fossils are known from nodules found on Alderton Hill near Alderton and Dumbleton in Gloucestershire, including Alderton Hill Quarry and other nearby localities.

See also 
 List of fossiliferous stratigraphic units in England
 Toarcian turnover
 Toarcian formations

Notes and references

Notes

References

Bibliography

Further reading 
 M. O'Sullivan, D. M. Martill, and D. Groocock. 2013. A pterosaur humerus and scapulocoracoid from the Jurassic Whitby Mudstone Formation, and the evolution of large body size in early pterosaurs. Proceedings of the Geologists' Association
 A. S. Smith and G. J. Dyke. 2008. The skull of the giant predatory pliosaur Rhomaleosaurus cramptoni: implications for plesiosaur phylogenetics. Naturwissenschaften 95:975-980 
 M. J. Benton and M. A. Taylor. 1984. Marine reptiles from the Upper Lias (Lower Toarcian, Lower Jurassic) of the Yorkshire coast. Proceedings of the Yorkshire Geological Society 44(4):399-429
 F. v. Huene. 1926. The carnivorous Saurischia in the Jura and Cretaceous formations, principally in Europe. Revista del Museo de La Plata 29:35-167
 C. W. Andrews. 1922. Note on the skeleton of a large plesiosaur (Rhomaleosaurus thorntoni, sp. n) from the Upper Lias of Northamptonshire. Annals and Magazine of Natural History 10:407-415
 R. Tate and J. F. Blake. 1876. The Yorkshire Lias 1-475

Geologic formations of England
Jurassic England
Early Jurassic Europe
Toarcian Stage
Mudstone formations
Shallow marine deposits
Open marine deposits
Paleontology in England
Geology of North Yorkshire
Geology of Worcestershire
Jurassic System of Europe